Jogan may refer to:

Jōgan, Japanese era name
Jogan (film), a 1950 Bollywood film